Qarah Aghaj-e Olya (also Romanized as Qarah Āghāj-e ‘Olyā; also known as Qarah Āqāj-e ‘Olyā and Qareh Āqāj-e ‘Olyā) is a village in Chaypareh-ye Pain Rural District, Zanjanrud District, Zanjan County, Zanjan Province, Iran. At the 2006 census, its population was 327, in 62 families.

References 

Populated places in Zanjan County